Alfred Eggleston (born 1901, date of death unknown) was an economist and the first Governor of the Bank of Ghana. He served as governor of the central bank from August 1957 to April 1959.

References

20th-century Ghanaian economists
Governors of Bank of Ghana
Year of death missing
1901 births